The 1923 Daimler Airway de Havilland DH.34 crash occurred on 14 September 1923 when a de Havilland DH.34 of Daimler Airway operating a scheduled domestic passenger flight from Croydon to Manchester crashed at Ivinghoe, Buckinghamshire, England, killing all five people on board.

Aircraft
The accident aircraft was de Havilland DH.34 G-EBBS, c/n 29. It had entered service with Daimler Hire Limited on 6 March 1922.

Accident
The flight was a scheduled domestic passenger flight from Croydon to Manchester. It was also reported to be carrying mail, although this was later denied by the General Post Office. While flying over Buckinghamshire, a storm was encountered. Witnesses stated that an engine stopped, but was then restarted. It appeared to them that an emergency landing was going to be made at Ford End, Ivinghoe when the aircraft dived to the ground and crashed at Ivinghoe. The accident happened at about 18:05. The wreckage came to rest upside down, with both crew and all three passengers being killed. One witness reported hearing a violent explosion, but was not sure whether this was before the aircraft crashed or as a result of the crash.

Villagers extricated the victims from the wreckage. The deceased were taken to Ivinghoe Town Hall pending an inquest by the coroner. As a result of the crash, Daimler Airway temporarily suspended their service between Croydon and Manchester, due to having no aircraft to operate it.

The inquest opened on 17 September at Ivinghoe Town Hall. Evidence was given that the pilot was experienced, having flown for 755 hours, and that the aircraft was airworthy on departure from Croydon. The aircraft could carry eight passengers, but as only three were on board  of ballast was carried, as well as a quantity of mail. Witnesses reported that the aircraft stalled before crashing. The inquest was adjourned until 24 September.

It was stated that the ballast was packed in such a way that it would not have moved in flight. The jury returned a verdict of "Accidental death" on all five victims. They agreed with the Coroner's suggestion that reports on investigations into aircraft accidents should be made available to the public, as was then the case with reports into railway accidents. This was something that The Times had called for in its issue of 19 September 1923, citing this accident and one that had occurred the previous month at East Malling, Kent.

Investigation
An investigation was opened into the accident by the Accidents Investigation Branch of the Air Ministry, with Major Cooper in charge. The investigation concluded that the accident was caused by pilot error. The aircraft had stalled while a precautionary landing was being attempted.

References

Aviation accidents and incidents in 1923
Aviation accidents and incidents in England
Airliner accidents and incidents caused by pilot error
1923 in England
History of Buckinghamshire
Transport in Buckinghamshire
20th century in Buckinghamshire
1923 disasters in the United Kingdom
Airliner accidents and incidents in the United Kingdom